Antranokarany is a municipality in Madagascar. It belongs to the district of Ambanja, which is a part of the Diana Region. According to a 2001 census, the population of Antranokarany was 7,221.

Only primary schooling is available in town. The majority of the population (96%) are farmers. The most important crop is coffee, while other important products are cocoa and rice.  Services provide employment for 1% of the population and fishing employs 3% of the population.

References and notes 

Populated places in Diana Region